Harry McFarland Bracken (March 12, 1926 – December 15, 2011) was an American philosopher, a specialist in   Descartes and friend of Noam Chomsky. His academic career was framed in relation to his anti-Vietnam War activism.

Bracken received a BA in Philosophy from Trinity College of Connecticut (1949), an MA in Philosophy from The Johns Hopkins University (1954), and a PhD in Philosophy from University of Iowa (1956). He held the position of Assistant Professor of Philosophy at the   University of Iowa (1957–62); Associate Professor of philosophy at University of Minnesota, Minneapolis (1961–63) and then Arizona State University  (1963–64); and finally  Professor of philosophy at McGill University (1966–91). He was a Visiting Professor at Trinity College of Dublin; University of California, San Diego; National University of Ireland; Erasmus University of Rotterdam; and University of Groningen in the Netherlands.

Bibliography 
In addition to many articles and reviews, Bracken's published books are:
 The Early Reception of Berkeley's Immaterialism: 1710–1733, The Hague: Nijhoff, 1959; revised ed., 1963. According to WorldCat, the book is held in 484   libraries 
 Berkeley, London: Macmillan, 1974 According to WorldCat, the book is held in 597 libraries 
 Mind and Language: Essays on Descartes and Chomsky, Dordrecht: Foris, 1983 
 Freedom of Speech: Words Are Not Deeds, Westport CT: Praeger [Greenwood], 1994. According to WorldCat, the book is held in 648 libraries 
 Descartes. Oxford: Oneworld, 2002

References

American philosophers
Trinity College (Connecticut) alumni
Johns Hopkins University alumni
University of Iowa alumni
Academic staff of McGill University
University of Iowa faculty
University of Minnesota faculty
Arizona State University faculty
1926 births
2011 deaths
20th-century American philosophers
21st-century American philosophers